The 1952–53 season was the 73rd season of competitive football in England.

Overview
This was the closest championship win in English league history at the time, with Arsenal claiming the title with a goal average superior to Preston's by just 0.099. Both Arsenal and Preston had identical records aside from their goal averages.

Had goal difference been the deciding factor as it was from 1977 onwards, Arsenal would still have won with +33 to Preston's +25, unlike in 1989 when they would have finished second on goal average. Preston had last been champions in 1890, the second season of the Football League.

The FA Cup was won by Blackpool, beating Bolton Wanderers 4–3 in what became known as the 'Matthews Final', due to the masterly contribution of 38-year-old winger Stanley Matthews, who helped his side win after going 3–1 down, although three of Blackpool's goals were scored by prolific forward Stan Mortensen.

Honours

Notes = Number in parentheses is the times that club has won that honour. * indicates new record for competition

Football League

First Division

Second Division

Third Division North

Third Division South

Top goalscorers

First Division
Charlie Wayman (Preston North End) – 23 goals

Second Division
Arthur Rowley (Leicester City) – 39 goals

Third Division North
Jimmy Whitehouse (Carlisle United) – 29 goals

Third Division South
Geoff Bradford (Bristol Rovers) – 33 goals

National team
The England national football team were joint winners in the 1953 British Home Championship with Scotland. In the May following the conclusion of the season the England team embarked on their first tour of the Americas, following the experience in Brazil of the 1950 FIFA World Cup.

American tour

Abandoned after 21 minutes due to torrential rain

References